Synsepalum revolutum is a species of flowering plant in the family Sapotaceae, native to west and west central tropical Africa. It was first described by John Gilbert Baker in 1877 as Sideroxylon revolutum.

Distribution
Synsepalum revolutum is native to Cameroon, the Central African Republic, Ghana, the Gulf of Guinea islands, Ivory Coast, Nigeria, and the Democratic Republic of the Congo.

Conservation
Vincentella densiflora was assessed as "vulnerable" in the 1998 IUCN Red List, where it is said to be native only to São Tomé Island, one of the Gulf of Guinea islands. , V. densiflora was regarded as a synonym of Synsepalum revolutum, which has a very much wider distribution.

References

revolutum
Flora of Cameroon
Flora of the Central African Republic
Flora of Ghana
Flora of the Gulf of Guinea islands
Flora of Ivory Coast
Flora of Nigeria
Flora of the Democratic Republic of the Congo
Plants described in 1877